Funky Snakefoot is the second album by American jazz drummer Alphonse Mouzon recorded in 1973 and released on the Blue Note label.

Reception
The AllMusic review by Jason Ankeny awarded the album 4½ stars stating "Alphonse Mouzon is celebrated largely for his drumming skills, the brilliant Funky Snakefoot is first and foremost a showcase for his keyboard prowess. Galvanized by its thick, greasy Arp, Moog, and organ solos, the album recalls Blue Note contemporaries like Gene Harris, albeit augmented by Mouzon's monster rhythms. Add his ragged-but-right vocals to the mix and Funky Snakefoot veers closer to mainstream R&B than virtually anything else the label ever released, but there's no denying the ferocity or virtuosity of this music".

Track listing
All compositions by Alphonse Mouzon
 "I've Given You My Love" - 4:43  
 "You Don't Know How Much I Love You" - 4:40  
 "I Gotta Have You" - 2:46  
 "My Life Is So Blue" - 4:37  
 "Funky Snakefoot" - 3:45  
 "My Little Rosebud" - 2:02  
 "A Permanent Love" - 4:20  
 "The Beggar" - 4:35  
 "Oh Yes I Do" - 4:35  
 "Tara, Tara" - 3:35  
 "Where I'm Drumming From" - 1:20  
 "Ism" - 3:08 
Recorded at Electric Lady Studios in New York City on December 10, 11 & 12, 1973

Personnel
Alphonse Mouzon  - drums, vocals, synthesizer, tack piano 
Randy Brecker - trumpet (tracks 1, 5, 7, 9 & 12)
Barry Rogers - trombone (tracks 1, 5, 7, 9 & 12)
Andy Gadsden - tenor saxophone (tracks 1, 5, 7, 9 & 12)
Harry Whitaker - piano, clavinet
Leon Pendarvis - electric piano, organ
Richie Resnicoff - guitar
Mark Harowitz - pedal steel guitar, banjo
Gary King - electric bass 
Ray Armando - conga, bongo
Angel Allende, Steve Berrios - percussion

References

Blue Note Records albums
Alphonse Mouzon albums
1974 albums